Dazan (also Romanized as Dāzān) is a village in Kuhestan Rural District, Jazmurian District, Rudbar-e Jonubi County, Kerman Province, Iran. At the 2006 census, its population was 466, in 91 families.

References 

Populated places in Rudbar-e Jonubi County